The Sanga do Cabral Formation is an Early Triassic sedimentary rock formation found in Rio Grande do Sul, Brazil.

Description 
This rock formation is located in the geopark of Paleorrota, and is located to the south of another geopark. The formation dates to 249 million years ago and belongs to the Lower Triassic.

The Sanga do Cabral Formation is correlated with the "impoverished zone" (Procolophon subzone) of the Lystrosaurus Assemblage Zone of the Karoo Basin of South Africa by some authors on the basis of the abundant records of Procolophon.

Fossil content 
Among others, the following fossils have been reported from the formation:
 Elessaurus gondwanoccidens
 Procolophon trigoniceps
 Sangaia lavinai
 Teyujagua paradoxa
 Tomeia witecki
 Cynodontia indet.
 Plagiosterninae indet.
 Temnospondyli indet.

Formations

See also 

 Santa Maria Formation
 Caturrita Formation
 List of dinosaur-bearing rock formations

References

Bibliography

Further reading 
 

Geologic formations of Brazil
Triassic System of South America
Early Triassic South America
Induan Stage
Olenekian Stage
Triassic Brazil
Sandstone formations
Conglomerate formations
Fluvial deposits
Fossiliferous stratigraphic units of South America
Paleontology in Brazil
Formations
Geography of Rio Grande do Sul